Allan Freese (born 7 July 1956) is a retired South African football (soccer) player and now coaches Cape Town All Stars.

Freese was replaced as Highlands Park head coach by Gordon Igesund after five league games into the 2016/17 PSL season and redeployed into the club's development coaching. He acted as the club's Head of Development before he took up a role as Head Coach with Royal Eagles in the NFD, when their coach Kosta Papic had taken ill and needed to undergo an urgent surgery in his homeland. Freese took permanent charge of the team still in the NFD at the start of the 2017/18 season, but following a poor start to their campaign, separated with Royal Eagles after just four matches.

Once the respected mentor and coach became available his former club Highlands Park F.C roped him in as assistant coach to longtime friend Owen Da Gama
following their failed debut Premier Soccer League season. They led the club to successful promotion campaign where they broke numerous records in a swift return to Premier Soccer League. Together they led the club to unprecedented 7th position finish on the table in the 2018/19 season.

Freese joined AmaZulu as an assistant coach for the 2020/2021 season, this with the sale of his former club Highlands Park.

Freese who holds a level 3 SAFA coaching qualification coupled with a KNVB qualification is active as a Coaches Instructor for the national body SAFA. He is active in his local community of Eldorado Park assisting in technical matters and presentations to amateur clubs and coaches.

Honours

Platinum Stars 
 2013 MTN8 winner
2013 Telkom KnoHckout winner

Highlands Park 
2015/16 PSL Promotion Playoffs Champion

References 

1956 births
Living people
People from Inkosi Langalibalele Local Municipality
South African soccer players
Orlando Pirates F.C. players
Association footballers not categorized by position
South African soccer managers
Platinum Stars F.C. managers
Highlands Park F.C. managers

AmaZulu F.C. managers
Free State Stars F.C. managers